Un Mundo Sin Mordaza is a human rights NGO headquartered in Venezuela. The organization  coordinates global activities within Venezuela and with the Venezuelan diaspora, including protests and media drives such as the SOS Venezuela campaign. Venezuelan security forces have politically persecuted the director of Un Mundo Sin Mordaza, Rodrigo Diamanti and the NGO Un Mundo Sin Mordaza has been the subject of different pronouncements of UN bodies. On May 16, 2014, the UN Special Rapporteur on the promotion and protection of the right to freedom of opinion and expression, the Special Rapporteur on the rights to freedom of peaceful assembly and of association and the Special Rapporteur on the situation of human rights defenders, sent a requirement to the Venezuelan government in which among other things they ask for further information about the judicial process against Diamanti.

See also 

 Foro Penal
PROVEA
 Venezuelan Observatory of Social Conflict

References

External links

Human rights organizations based in Venezuela